Donald S. Bustany (August 10, 1928 – April 23, 2018) was an American radio and television broadcaster.

Biography
Bustany was born in Detroit to Lebanese-American parents. He and radio host/voice actor Casey Kasem were childhood friends, and later co-creators of the syndicated radio programs American Top 40 and American Country Countdown.

In the 1970s, Bustany was camera coordinator of The Mary Tyler Moore Show, The Bob Newhart Show, and other MTM productions. Earlier he had produced local talk shows on several Los Angeles, California stations.

Education
Bustany graduated with a BA in Liberal Arts from Wayne State University and an MS in Communications from Syracuse University.

Activism
Bustany was an activist for the Palestinian right of return. From 1996 until 2014, he produced and hosted the radio program Middle East in Focus on KPFK, the Los Angeles station of the Pacifica Radio network; he remained a correspondent to the program. The show's "mission is to fill the many gaps left by the mainstream media in their coverage" of the Middle East.

He was a member of the advisory committee of the American-Arab Anti-Discrimination Committee and, in the 1990s, served for four terms as president of the organization's Los Angeles chapter.

For his statements regarding the Zionist Movement and Israel, he had been criticized by such organizations as the JDL and the Zionist Organization of America. He was also a member of the board of directors of the Southern California Chapter of Americans for Democratic Action.

Death
Bustany died on April 23, 2018, in Santa Barbara, California, aged 89.

References

External links

"Don Bustany: Truth Be Told", Washington Report on Middle East Affairs, January/February 1999 (pp. 51, 84)

1928 births
2018 deaths
American activists
American radio personalities
American people of Lebanese descent
American Top 40
Radio personalities from Detroit